"Get It Together" is a song by American hip-hop group the Beastie Boys, released as the second single from their fourth studio album, Ill Communication. The album version of the song features rapper Q-Tip of A Tribe Called Quest, but not the single version. The song contains vocal samples from the song "Headless Heroes" by Eugene McDaniels, and heavily samples a loop from "Aquarius/Let the Sunshine In" by the Moog Machine, from the album Switched-On Rock. The song also appears on two group's compilation albums The Sounds of Science and Beastie Boys Music.

Track listing
 CD single
 "Get It Together" (LP version) - 4:07
 "Sabotage" (LP version) - 3:00
 "Dope Little Song" - 1:48

 US 12" single
 Side A - 01 - "Get It Together" (LP Version)
 Side A - 02 - "Get It Together" (Buck-Wild Remix)
 Side A - 03 - "Resolution Time"
 Side A - 04 - "Get It Together" (Buck-Wild Instrument)
 Side B - 01 - "Get It Together" (A.B.A. Remix)
 Side B - 02 - "Sabotage" (LP Version)
 Side B - 03 - "Dope Little Song"
 Side B - 04 - "Get It Together" (A.B.A. Instrumental)

 UK CD single
 "Get It Together"
 "Sabotage"
 "Get It Together" (Beastie Boys Remix)
 "Resolution Time"

Charts

References

Beastie Boys songs
1994 songs
1994 singles
Songs written by Ad-Rock
Songs written by Mike D
Songs written by Adam Yauch
Songs written by Q-Tip (musician)
Song recordings produced by Mario Caldato Jr.